Banu Alkan (born Liz Remka Rebronja; 1 April 1958) is a Turkish-Croatian actress. She moved to Edremit, Balıkesir, Turkey in 1966 when she was eight years old. She is described as an "80s pop culture icon of Turkey". Her first film appearance was in the 1976 film Taksi Şoförü (Taxi Driver) directed by Şerif Gören.

Filmography
 İsyan (1975)
 Taksi Şoförü (1976)
 Akrep Yuvası (1977)
 Vurun Beni Öldürün (1980)
 Ağla Gözlerim (1981)
 Günah Defteri (1981)
 Ben De Özledim (1981)
 Nikah Masası (1982)
 Aşkların En Güzeli (1982)
 İlişki (1983)
 Bataklıkta Bir Gül (1983)
 Gecelerin Kadını (1983)
 Kadınca (1984)
 Sokaktan Gelen Kadın (1984)
 Kızgın Güneş (1984)
 Katiller De Ağlar (1985)
 Arzu (1985)
 Bu İkiliye Dikkat (1985)
 Sarı Bela (1985)
 Mavi Yolculuk (1986)
 Seviyorum (1986)
 Afrodit (1987)
 Güneşten De Sıcak / Sarı Güneş (1987)
 Yaşamak (1988)
 Vahşi Ve Güzel (1989)
 Afrodit Banu Alkanın Hayatı (2000)
 Renkli Dünyalar  (2000) - (TV series)
 Tuzu Kurular (2001) - (TV series)
 Kızma Birader (2005) - (TV series)
 Afrodit (2010) Short film

Discography 
 Afrodit / Neremi (1998)
 Dansa Kaldır (2000)
 Beyaz Orkide (2005)
 Best of 2011 Remix (2011)

Awards 
2014 The Most Beautiful Woman of Turkish Cinema
2015 2nd Golden Palm - Yeşilçam 100th Anniversary Honorary Award
2015 Mersin Culture Solidarity Association Award Ceremony - Yeşilçam 100th Anniversary Honorary Award

References

External links

Living people
1958 births
Turkish film actresses
Turkish television actresses
People from Dubrovnik
Turkish people of Croatian descent
Naturalized citizens of Turkey
Bosniaks of Croatia
Croatian people of Turkish descent
Turkish people of Bosniak descent